Never Scared is a television special that premiered on HBO on April 17, 2004, starring comedian Chris Rock. It is the fourth special by Chris Rock recorded at the DAR Constitution Hall in Washington, D.C., on March 24, 2004.

CD version

The CD version, released on February 15, 2005, includes several recorded segments including a rap song performed with Lil' Jon called "Get Lower", and recurring themes of "Thug Radio" and "Tip Your Hat to Whitey".  At the conclusion of the album is a spoof movie trailer titled "Who Tha Fuck You Looking At"; the protagonists are made out to be black men, but the voice-over gives the cast as Steven Seagal, Chingy, Sidney Poitier and the sound of machine guns.

The skit "The Morning After" is a parody of "Where Are My Panties" from the album Speakerboxxx/The Love Below by Outkast.

Track listing
 "Thug Radio Intro" – 0:25
 "Off the Pole" – 5:57
 "Real People of Ignorance (Rap Star)" – 1:02
 "Smack Her With A Dick (Rap Stand Up)" – 9:25
 "K-Rock" – 0:12
 "Get Lower (featuring Lil' Jon)" – 2:38
 "Jacksons Gone Wild" – 10:05
 "Thug News" – 0:34
 "Tip Your Hat to Whitey (Hawaii)" – 1:19
 "The War" – 3:01
 "Black Poet" – 1:48
 "Feed Other Countries" – 1:38
 "Ballmart" – 0:38
 "Drugs, Donuts, & Wealth" – 9:42
 "Thug Radio ID" – 0:10
 "Tip Your Hat to Whitey (Jamaica)" – 1:33
 "Affirmative Action" – 7:50
 "Tip Your Hat to Whitey (Mars)" – 1:27
 "Don't Cheat" – 1:29
 "The Morning After" – 0:21
 "Real People of Ignorance (Tattoo)" – 1:03
 "Women Hate Women" – 2:42
 "K-Rock ID #2" – 0:05
 "Marriage" – 7:42
 "Thug Radio Sign Off" – 2:40

Reception
Never Scared won the 2006 Grammy Award for Best Comedy Album.

References in popular culture
The 2012 rap song "Fair Fight"  by the group Strong Arm Steady samples a quote from the special, alongside a number of quotes from Eddie Griffin's DysFUNKtional Family comedy show.

References

External links

2004 television specials
2005 live albums
2000s American television specials
2000s comedy albums
Chris Rock albums
DreamWorks Records live albums
Grammy Award for Best Comedy Album
HBO network specials
Stand-up comedy concert films
Television shows written by Chris Rock
Films directed by Joel Gallen